Rubus nigerrimus is rare North American species of brambles in the rose family. It has been found only in the States of Oregon and Washington in the northwestern United States.

Rubus nigerrimus is up to 2 meters (80 inches) tall, strongly armed with straight prickles. Leaves are compound with 3 or 5 leaflets. Flowers are white. Fruit almost black, with woolly hairs.

The genetics of Rubus is extremely complex, so that it is difficult to decide on which groups should be recognized as species. There are many rare species with limited ranges such as this. Further study is suggested to clarify the taxonomy.

References

nigerrimus
Plants described in 1897
Flora of Washington (state)
Flora of Oregon
Flora without expected TNC conservation status